The Liaison Committee for the Reconstruction of the Fourth International (in Spanish: Comité de Enlace por la Reconstrución de la IV Internacional) is a Trotskyist international organization, based in Latin America. It was generally known by its Spanish acronym CERCI. CERCI was founded in 1988. The leading character in CERCI was Guillermo Lora, the leader of the Bolivian POR.

Founding members of CERCI included:
 Revolutionary Workers Party in Argentina.
 Revolutionary Workers Party in Bolivia.
 Revolutionary Workers Party in Brazil, founded in 1989, joined CERCI.

CERCI is still active. POR in Bolivia still refers to itself as a section of CERCI. A 2009 obituary to Guillermo Lora was signed by CERCI.

External links
POR Brazil 
POR Argentina
POR Bolivia

References

Trotskyist political internationals